Hazard statements form part of the Globally Harmonized System of Classification and Labelling of Chemicals (GHS). They are intended to form a set of standardized phrases about the hazards of chemical substances and mixtures that can be translated into different languages. As such, they serve the same purpose as the well-known R-phrases, which they are intended to replace. 

Hazard statements are one of the key elements for the labelling of containers under the GHS, along with:
an identification of the product
one or more hazard pictograms (where necessary)
a signal word – either Danger or Warning – where necessary
precautionary statements, indicating how the product should be handled to minimize risks to the user (as well as to other people and the general environment)
the identity of the supplier (who might be a manufacturer or importer).

Each hazard statement is designated a code, starting with the letter H and followed by three digits. Statements which correspond to related hazards are grouped together by code number, so the numbering is not consecutive. The code is used for reference purposes, for example to help with translations, but it is the actual phrase which should appear on labels and safety data sheets.

Physical hazards

Health hazards

Environmental hazards

Country-specific hazard statements

European Union 
The European Union has implemented the GHS through the CLP Regulation. Nevertheless, the older system based on the Dangerous Substances Directive was used in parallel until June 2015. Some R-phrases which do not have simple equivalents under the GHS have been retained under the CLP Regulation: the numbering mirrors the number of the previous R-phrase.

Physical properties 

EUH006: Explosive with or without contact with air, deleted in the fourth adaptation to technical progress of CLP.
EUH014: Reacts violently with water
EUH018: In use may form flammable/explosive vapour-air mixture
EUH019: May form explosive peroxides
EUH044: Risk of explosion if heated under confinement

Health properties 
EUH029: Contact with water liberates toxic gas
EUH031: Contact with acids liberates toxic gas
EUH032: Contact with acids liberates very toxic gas
EUH066: Repeated exposure may cause skin dryness or cracking
EUH070: Toxic by eye contact
EUH071: Corrosive to the respiratory tract

Environmental properties 
EUH059: Hazardous to the ozone layer, superseded by GHS Class 5.1 in the second adaptation to technical progress of CLP.

Other EU hazard statements 
Some other hazard statements intended for use in very specific circumstances have also been retained under the CLP Regulation. Note that, in this case, the numbering of the EU specific hazard statements can coincide with GHS hazard statements if the "EU" prefix is not included.
EUH201: Contains lead. Should not be used on surfaces liable to be chewed or sucked by children.
EUH201A: Warning! Contains lead.
EUH202: Cyanoacrylate. Danger. Bonds skin and eyes in seconds. Keep out of the reach of children.
EUH203: Contains chromium(VI). May produce an allergic reaction.
EUH204: Contains isocyanates. May produce an allergic reaction.
EUH205: Contains epoxy constituents. May produce an allergic reaction.
EUH206: Warning! Do not use together with other products. May release dangerous gases (chlorine).
EUH207: Warning! Contains cadmium. Dangerous fumes are formed during use. See information supplied by the manufacturer. Comply with the safety instructions.
EUH208: Contains <name of sensitising substance>. May produce an allergic reaction.
EUH209: Can become highly flammable in use.
EUH209A: Can become flammable in use.
EUH210: Safety data sheet available on request.
EUH211: Warning! Hazardous respirable droplets may be formed when sprayed. Do not breathe spray or mist.
EUH401: To avoid risks to human health and the environment, comply with the instructions for use.

Australia 
The GHS was adopted in Australia from 1 January 2012 and becomes mandatory in States and Territories that have adopted the harmonised Work Health and Safety laws (other than Victoria and Western Australia) as of 1 January 2017. The National Code of Practice for the Preparation of Safety Data Sheets for Hazardous Chemicals  includes 12 Australian-specific GHS Hazard Statements, as follows:

Physical hazard statements 
AUH001: Explosive without moisture 	
AUH006: Explosive with or without contact with air	
AUH014: Reacts violently with water	
AUH018: In use, may form a flammable/explosive vapor-air mixture	
AUH019: May form explosive peroxides	
AUH044: Risk of explosion if heated under confinement

Human health hazard statements 
AUH029: Contact with water liberates toxic gas	
AUH031: Contact with acids liberates toxic gas

Additional non-GHS hazard statements 
AUH032: Contact with acids liberates very toxic gas	
AUH066: Repeated exposure may cause skin dryness or cracking	
AUH070: Toxic by eye contact	
AUH071: Corrosive to the respiratory tract

New Zealand 
As of March 2009, the relevant New Zealand regulations under the Hazardous Substances and New Organisms Act 1996 do not specify the exact wording required for hazard statements. However, the New Zealand classification system includes three categories of environmental hazard which are not included in the GHS Rev.2:
Ecotoxicity to soil environment
Ecotoxicity to terrestrial vertebrates
Ecotoxicity to terrestrial invertebrates
These are classes 9.2–9.4 respectively of the New Zealand classification scheme, and are divided into subclasses according to the degree of hazard. Substances in subclass 9.2D ("Substances that are slightly harmful in the soil environment") do not require a hazard statement, while substances in the other subclasses require an indication of the general degree of hazard and general type of hazard.

Notes

References 
 ("GHS Rev.4")
 ("GHS Rev.2")
 (New Zealand)
 (New Zealand)
 (the "CLP Regulation")

External links 
 Chemical Hazard & Precautionary Phrases in 23 European Languages, machine-readable and versioned

Hazard statements